Seyyed Vahid Ghiasi (born 23 August 1975) is an Iranian professional futsal coach and former player. He is the younger brother of Mahdi Ghiasi.

Honours

Player
 Iranian Futsal Super League
 Runners-up (1): 2004–05 (Eram Kish)

Manager
 Iran Futsal's 1st Division
 Runners-up (1): 2016–17 (Ana Sanat)

References 

1975 births
Living people
People from Qom
Iranian men's futsal players
Almas Shahr Qom FSC players
Dabiri FSC players
Iranian futsal coaches